Infratek is a company based in Norway, Sweden, Finland and Denmark, with its main office in Oslo, Norway. Infratek has 1,350 employees and had revenues of approximately NOK 2.7 billion in 2015.

History
Up until 2007 Infratek constituted the business area Technical Services in the Norwegian power corporation Hafslund ASA, when it was listed as a separate company on the Oslo Stock Exchange on December 5, 2007.

In 2009 the company expanded from 1000 employees to 2000 employees with the acquisition of the Fortum Contracting Entities in Norway, Sweden and Finland.

Operations
The company is a supplier in the market for building, operating and securing of critical infrastructure. Infratek offers services within power grids, railway systems, fiber networks, district heating, public street lighting and technical high security solutions.

The Infratek Group is divided into three business areas: Central Infrastructure, Local Infrastructure and Security.

References 

Article from hegnar.no - New contract with Statnett, 12.2.2012

Article from Stocklink - Contract with Trafikverket in Sweden

Article from Dagens Næringsliv/TDN Finans - Q2 results 2009 for the Infratek Group, 25.8.2009

External links 

 Official website

Companies based in Oslo